Andrew Putnam Hill High School is a public secondary school, magnet, International Baccalaureate World School, and located in the Edenvale neighbourhood of San Jose, California, United States. The school opened in 1956, and educates approximately 2,173 students in grades 9–12. It is one of eighteen schools of the East Side Union High School District (ESUHSD). It is named after Californian painter and preservationist Andrew P. Hill.

Demographics 
As of 2012, Andrew Hill High's demographics is close to that of Yerba Buena High School's, and is roughly 60% Mexican American, 33% Asian American, 2.9% White, 2.3% African American and 1.4% other (Native American and Pacific Islander).

As of the 2011-2012 school year, Andrew Hill High School had a 73.4% graduation rate amongst its senior class. This number is up from the 2010-2011 graduation rate of 72.7%, but still a two-year low from the 2009-2010 graduation rate of 78.3%. Of these students, 30.6% who graduated, or 131 of 585 of the senior class students, graduated having met the requirements to admission to the University of California and/or California State University campuses.

In 2007, 45% of the school's students qualified for the free lunch program, compared to the district average of 25%. In 2010, 55% of the school's students qualified for the federally subsidized lunches, the best measure of the percentage of low-income students at each school. Andrew Hill receives Title I low income funding under the No Child Left Behind Act.

History 
There was a movement to make the school a charter school. However, this push was rejected by district trustees, though the effort continued.  If the effort succeeded, Andrew Hill would have become the largest charter school in Northern California.

Curriculum 
Advanced Placement (AP) courses are offered at Andrew Hill. As of 2011, 33% of students participated in at least one AP course and/or exam. The average number of tests per students taking the AP exams was 2.4.

The school has the Medical MAGNET program for students to begin in grade 10 until graduation, designed to further educate participating high school students with a focus on medicine, and involves science classes and education in medical literature.

The Biotech Academy is also available, and is coordinated by Paul Moradkhan. It is a California Partnership Academy (CPA), similar to the MAGNET programs, designed for participating high school students as a career focused education in the field of biotechnology. Students are enrolled in the academy from grade 10 through 12.

IB
The International Baccalaureate (IB) Programme has been offered at Andrew Hill since February 2003. Students may take the entire Diploma Programme, or single IB courses stand alone for certificates, only during grades 11 and 12. The current IB Programme coordinator at the school is Michael Winsatt.

In the 2012–2013 school year, Andrew Hill students took IB courses at both the higher and standard levels in English, mathematics, music, Spanish, theatre and visual arts, only at the higher level in history, and only at the standard level in chemistry, biology, French, physics, sports science and Vietnamese. Students in the full IB Diploma Programme are required to take history (Group 3) and English (Group 1) at the higher level both Diploma years at Andrew Hill, as well as Theory of Knowledge. Students may decide to take their third higher level in the remaining subjects: the sciences (Group 4), the arts (Group 6), foreign languages (Group 2) and mathematics (Group 5). In addition to taking seven IB classes during the two years, Andrew Hill Diploma candidates must also complete the Extended Essay (EE), a 4,000-word report, and the Creativity, action, service (CAS) profile.

Of the student population, 20% partake in at least one IB class in the school during their enrollment. Of those, 10.8% are full IB Diploma candidates, and 2.2% of the grade 12 students are IB Diploma candidates. On average, each student participating in IB from Andrew Hill takes 4.8 subject tests during their enrollment.

Campus
The campus of Andrew Hill High School consists primarily of seven buildings of classrooms, two groups of portables, two gyms and locker rooms, a cafeteria attached to the music hall, and an administrative building attached to the library. The classroom buildings are named the "200", "300", "400", "500", "600", "S" buildings and Schaefer Hall., with the "100" building having been torn down in 2013 in order to construct a replacement. The portables are named the "B" and "C" portables, with the "A" portables taken down in the same construction as the "100" building. There are two gyms, one larger and one smaller, respectively named the "Large Gym" and "Small Gym". The music hall was renamed to Eschenfelder Hall in 2016, after music instructor Thomas Eschenfelder, who retired the same year.

Notable alumni
 George Achica, former lineman in the USFL and NFL
 Steve Caballero, professional skateboarder.
 Captain Jason M. Dahl, pilot of United Airlines Flight 93; Hillsdale Elementary School was renamed Captain Jason M. Dahl Elementary School in his honor
 Skip Spence, co-founder of Moby Grape and the original drummer for Jefferson Airplane; He attended Andrew P. Hill his freshman year (1962) before dropping out of high school in his sophomore year
 Mervyn Fernandez, former wide receiver in the CFL and NFL
 Mike Honda, congressman for California's 15th congressional district
 Jim McMahon, former NFL quarterback (attended 1973–1975)
Jayson Obazuaye, former professional basketball player and ex-University of Colorado guard
 Miguel Perez, actor and writer
 Andrew X. Pham, author of Catfish and Mandala: A Two-Wheeled Voyage Through the Landscape and Memory of Vietnam
 Traxamillion, hip hop producer associated with the Hyphy genre
 Lynn Washington, former University of Indiana basketball star and professional basketball star in Japan.
 Daniel Valencia, photographer and artist

See also
Santa Clara County high schools

References

External links
 Andrew Hill Wiki (no longer maintained)
 Andrew P. Hill High School website
 Andrew P. Hill High School profile provided by schooltree.org
 East Side Union High School District website

East Side Union High School District
Hill High School, Andrew Putnam
International Baccalaureate schools in California
Public high schools in California
1956 establishments in California